Balmoor (also known as Balmoor Stadium) is an association football ground in the Scottish town of Peterhead, Aberdeenshire. It is home to Peterhead. The stadium has a capacity of  spectators, of which 1,000 can be seated.

The ground was opened in 1997, after Peterhead's old Recreation Park ground was sold off to supermarket company Safeway. The standard of the facilities at Balmoor was one of the main reasons why Peterhead were elected to the Scottish Football League in 2000, along with Elgin City.

The record attendance at Balmoor is 4,855, for a Scottish Football League Third Division match against Rangers on 20 January 2013. This broke the previous record crowd of 4,505.

This is the greatest distance between a senior league football ground and its nearest railway station in Great Britain. Balmoor is located on the A982 road, just north of Peterhead town centre.

References

Football venues in Scotland
Peterhead F.C.
Scottish Football League venues
Sports venues in Aberdeenshire
Scottish Professional Football League venues
Sports venues completed in 1997
Sports venues in Peterhead